This listing of radio stations that are branded as ESPN Radio is an incomplete sampling of major markets (as of November 2020).  The full list of "full-time" affiliates (not all of which are branded "ESPN Radio") can be found at the ESPN website.

Alabama

Alaska

Arizona

Arkansas

California

Colorado

Connecticut

District of Columbia

Florida

Georgia

Hawaii

Idaho

Illinois

Indiana

Iowa

Kansas

Kentucky

Louisiana

Maine

Maryland

Massachusetts

Michigan

Minnesota

Mississippi

Missouri

Montana

Nebraska

Nevada

New Jersey

New Mexico

New York

North Carolina

North Dakota

Ohio

Oklahoma

Oregon

Pennsylvania

Puerto Rico

Rhode Island

South Carolina

South Dakota

Tennessee

Texas

Utah

Vermont

Virginia

Washington

West Virginia

Wisconsin

Wyoming

Canada
ESPN owns a minority interest in the sports network TSN alongside its majority owner Bell Media: in 2011, the company converted three of its stations to a new sports radio network known as TSN Radio.  Much like its television counterpart, all three TSN Radio stations also carry programs from ESPN Radio (such as select event coverage, along with overnight and weekend programming).

Defunct or moved ESPN Radio affiliates
The following is the list of radio stations that were previously ESPN Radio affiliates.

References